Major General Prasanna de Silva , WWV, RWP, RSP is a retired Sri Lankan senior army officer, who served as the General Officer Commanding, 56 Division, Commander of Special Forces Brigade and he was the Colonel of the Regiment of the Commando Regiment.

Education 
Educated at Ananda College, Colombo.

Military career 
He joined Sri Lanka Army 1982 during the early phase of Eelam War I.

Brigadier Silva’s little known exploits included the coordination of Long Range Reconnaissance Patrol which carried out most complex and dangerous military operations when he was a Lieutenant Colonel.

Silva was the ground commander for the Mavil Aru, Sampoor, Manirasakulam and then the famous Vakarai Operations.

He became a major threat to LTTE during Sri Lankan Civil War because he was in command of the Army’s elite Brigade Special Forces which successful in assassinating several high-level commanders of the LTTE in LTTE-held territory.

The 55 Division under the command of Brigadier Prasanna De Silva marched more than 100 km linking up with Wanni front at Elephant Pass to re open the A-9 road and clearing  the sea tigers bases covering the Eastern Coastal line starting from Nagar Kovil to Mullaitivu.

Family 
He is married to Dinithi De Silva who is a former air hostess at Sri Lankan Airlines and they have two daughters Yohani De Silva and Shavindri De Silva.

Further reading 
https://prasannadesilva.wordpress.com/

References 

Sinhalese military personnel
Sri Lankan major generals
Living people
Alumni of Ananda College
1961 births